The RG-32 Scout is a family of mine-resistant 4×4 light armoured vehicles made by BAE Systems Land Systems South Africa (formerly Land Systems OMC) in South Africa. It is based on the RG-31, which is already deployed worldwide with peace-keeping, security and combat forces. The combat weight of the vehicle is about 7,300 kg and it has the capacity to carry a crew of 5 to 7. The vehicle crew is protected against 5.56×45mm NATO ball ammunition, grenades, firebombs, anti-personnel mines and side blasts. The five-seat version also offers protection against anti-tank mines and side blasts. Up to two RG-32Ms can be transported in a C-130 cargo aircraft.

The latest development of this vehicle is the RG-32M Galten (Swedish for "The Boar" or "The Hog"). The RG-32M has undergone "winterisation" modifications in Sweden; the RG-32M has been used in environments ranging from 49 °C (120 °F) in the deserts of Africa and the Middle East to −35 °C (-31 °F) in parts of Sweden.

Production history

Variants
 RG-32M Standard (Driver + 4)
 RG-32M Full armour (Driver + 8)
 RG-32M LTV Light Tactical Vehicle

Operators

More than 800 RG-32 vehicles are in service worldwide, including with:

Current operators
 — 180
 — 74 To be replaced by Sisu GTP in the near future.

 — 27 RG Outrider
  - 8
 — Operated in limited numbers, potential replacement for ageing fleet of BRDM-2 currently in service.
-400
 — 380

Civilian operators
 United States Used by the Federal Bureau of Investigation SWAT Teams, and by various local police forces

See also
 Buffel
 Casspir
 Mamba APC
 RCV-9
 RG-12
 RG-19
 RG-31
 RG-33
 RG-34
 RG-35

References

External links
 BAE OMC RG-32 Scout (Armoured Patrol Vehicle Alternative) at Canadian American Strategic Review

BAE Systems land vehicles
Armoured personnel carriers of South Africa
Military light utility vehicles
Wheeled armoured personnel carriers
Armoured personnel carriers of the post–Cold War period